Dr. Mohammad Jahangir Khan  (1 February 1910 – 23 July 1988) played cricket for India during British rule and after independence served as a cricket administrator in Pakistan. He graduated from Islamia College, Lahore.

Cricket career 
Jahangir, who hailed from a Pashtun family, was a big man who stood six feet and bowled medium pace. He came from a famous cricketing family that produced Pakistan captains Baqa Jilani, Imran Khan, Javed Burki and Majid Khan, the last being his son. Majid's son Bazid Khan also represented Pakistan for the first time in 2005, making the family the second, after the Headleys to have three consecutive generations of Test cricketers. Baqa Jilani is brother in law of Dr. Mohammad Jahangir Khan also represented India in Test Cricket.

Jahangir scored 108 on his first-class debut and took seven wickets in the second innings of the match. He represented India in her first ever Test against England at Lord's in 1932. After the tour, he stayed back in England and took a doctorate from Cambridge University. He passed the final Bar from Middle Temple. In that time he was Cambridge blue in cricket for four years. He also made two appearances in Gentlemen v Players matches. In 1935 playing for Indian Gymkhana, he also scored 1380 runs in two months, at an average of 70.

When India toured England in 1936 he joined the team and appeared in all three Tests. His best bowling during his time at Cambridge was a 7 for 58 against the champion county Yorkshire. Back in India, he played in the Bombay Pentangular in 1939. Jahangir was to captain India in a tour of Ceylon in 1940–41 that was cancelled due to the war.

Selector 
Jahangir was a selector between 1939–40 and 1941–42. After moving to Pakistan after 1947, he served a selector in Pakistan and managed the team that toured India in 1960–1961. He was a college principal and then served as the Director of Education in Pakistan before retiring. When Jalandhar hosted its first Test match in 1983, Jahangir was specially invited to attend the match. In his younger days, he was also a champion javelin thrower of India. He represented India in AAA in 1932 and British Empire Games 1934 in London.

Death 
At the time of his death, he was the last survivor from the team that played for India in his first Test.

He was buried in his hometown.

The Lord's Sparrow
Khan played cricket for Cambridge University and during a match at Lord's Cricket Ground on 26 July 1936 against the M.C.C. he bowled a delivery to Tom Pearce that struck and killed a sparrow while in mid-flight. The sparrow was mounted on a plinth with the ball that killed it and is now on display at the M.C.C. museum. Neil Robinson, head of heritage and collections at the M.C.C. said "People expect to see balls, bats and gloves at the museum, not a sparrow" and "Those who don't know the story are always surprised."

References

External links
 

1910 births
1988 deaths
Indian cricketers
India Test cricketers
Cricketers from Jalandhar
Pakistani cricketers
Gentlemen cricketers
Muslims cricketers
Cambridge University cricketers
Marylebone Cricket Club cricketers
Northern India cricketers
Southern Punjab cricketers
North Zone cricketers
Punjab (Pakistan) cricketers
North v South cricketers
Jahangir
Pashtun people
Indian emigrants to Pakistan
Pakistani cricket administrators
Athletes (track and field) at the 1934 British Empire Games
Indian male javelin throwers
Commonwealth Games competitors for India
Roshanara Club cricketers